The Baltimore City Heritage Walk is a heritage trail that links 20 historic sites and museums in downtown Baltimore, Maryland.

It is 3.2 miles long.

Sites and museums located along the trail include:
U.S.S. Constellation Museum, Pier 1, (Constellation Dock), East Pratt Street, at South Calvert Street
World Trade Center / Top of the World observation deck, (Maryland Port Administration), Pier 2,  401 East Pratt Street
Baltimore Maritime Museum, (Historic Ships in Baltimore), Pier 3 (and Piers 4 & 5), 500 block - East Pratt Street
Baltimore Public Works Museum, (old Eastern Avenue Sewage Pumping Station), 751 Eastern Avenue, at President Street boulevard.
President Street Station, (Baltimore Civil War Museum), 601 President Street [boulevard], at Fleet Street
Star-Spangled Banner Flag House, and War of 1812 Museum, (home of Mary Pickersgill), 844 East Pratt Street at Albemarle Street
Reginald F. Lewis Museum of Maryland African American History & Culture, 830 East Pratt Street (at President Street boulevard)
Carroll Mansion, (city townhouse/mansion of Charles Carroll of Carrollton), East Lombard Street, off Front Street / President Street boulevard
Jewish Museum of Maryland, (Lloyd Street Synagogue and B'nai Israel Synagogue), Lloyd Street at Watson Street (off East Lombard Street)
McKim Free School, 1120  East Baltimore Street at Asquith Street
Old Town Friends' Meetinghouse, 1201 East Fayette Street, at Asquith Street
Nine North Front Street (Second Mayor Thorowgood Smith's Home / Women's Civic League offices)
Phoenix Shot Tower, East Fayette and North Front Streets
St. Vincent de Paul Roman Catholic Church, 120 North Front Street (at East Fayette Street)
War Memorial Plaza (War Memorial Hall), 100 block North Gay Streets, between East Fayette and Lexington Streets
Zion Church of the City of Baltimore, (Evangelical Lutheran), 400 East Lexington Street at North Gay Street
Peale Museum, (old Municipal Museum - now conference center), 225 North Holliday Street
Baltimore City Hall, 100 Holliday Street (between East Fayette and Lexington Streets)
Battle Monument, (War of 1812 / Battle of Baltimore, 1814), 100 block North Calvert Street, between East Fayette and East Lexington Streets
Alex. Brown Building, 135 East Baltimore Street, at South Calvert Street

See also
List of heritage walks
Freedom Trail
Oyster Bay History Walk

References

External links
Sightseeing and Walking Tours from Baltimore.org

Historic trails and roads in Maryland
Geography of Baltimore
Urban heritage trails
History of Baltimore